The RDS-9 was part of a string of Nuclear weapon testing by the Soviet Union. It was tested on October 19, 1954. This test was the first failure in the RDS series of tests. It was developed originally for the T-5 torpedo. The weapon was modified and retested in 1955.

References 

 
Nuclear weapons testing 
Nuclear weapons of the Soviet Union 
1954 in the Soviet Union
Nuclear bombs of the Soviet Union